VEPR is a Ukrainian multi-purpose off-road vehicle designed and assembled by the Kremenchuk Automobile Assembly Plant.  (The name is a pun:Ukrainian: Вепр, wild boar.)

The designers' goal was to create an SUV-type vehicle which would have the same terrain ability traditionally reserved for larger cargo vehicles, such as the KrAZ and Ural. The patent has been received for the passenger-cargo vehicle.

The per-unit price of the VEPR is estimated to be between $50,000 and $250,000.

Description
Fuel consumption is said to be modest for a vehicle of this size, with 14 liters per 100 km in urban areas, and 11.5 liters per 100 km on highways. This makes the VEPR more fuel-efficient than the smaller Hummer.

Standard modification includes:
 Adjustable pressure tires for use on all terrains
 A/C and heat independent of the engine
 Drum brakes of closed type, for harsh temperatures and driving over ford crossings, can clear up to 1.5 meter water level
 Stainless steel frame and parts
 BTR-94 wheels

Variants
 VEPR-K "Commander" (ВЕПР-К «Командир»)
 military armored variant
 extreme off-road, civilian unarmored variant. It is said to be targeted at the American Hummer SUV. photo
 VEPR-K "Sport" (ВЕПР-К «Спорт») - unarmored rally car, at least one was made in 2013 photo
 VEPR-M "Hunter" (ВЕПР-М «Мисливець») - Fully enclosed unarmored cab-forward truck photo
 VEPR-S "Special" (ВЕПР-С «Спеціальний») - fully enclosed cab-forward multi-purpose armored vehicle with «Кольчуга» passive sensor or «Мандат-Б1Е» electronic countermeasure system. Only 15 were made. Not produced since May 2011 photo

Production
At least 10 vehicles have been produced for the Siberian Tyumen and Yakutiya regions, Kazakhstan, and Kyrgyzstan until 15 March 2006.

Operators

Current operators
  - 1 VEPR-S "Special" since May 2008
  - 1 VEPR-S "Special" since May 2008

References

External links
 http://vepr.com.ua/ - official site of VEPR 
 http://forums.finalgear.com/automotive-news/ukrainian-vepr-14023/ - forum discussion on VEPR 
 http://video.aol.com/video-detail/-vepr/1194143355 - test-drive video of VEPR 

Off-road vehicles
All-wheel-drive vehicles
Armoured fighting vehicles of Ukraine
Military trucks
Cars of Ukraine
Expanded length sport utility vehicles
Military vehicles introduced in the 2000s